Cameron Tate Steel (born 13 September 1995) is an English cricketer who plays for Surrey. He is a right-handed batsman and right  arm leg spin bowler. He made his first-class debut for Durham MCCU against Derbyshire, on 1 April 2014.

On 8 October 2016, after his release from Middlesex, Steel signed for Durham ahead of the 2017 season. He made his List A debut for Durham in the 2017 Royal London One-Day Cup on 27 April 2017. He made his Twenty20 cricket debut for Durham in the 2017 NatWest t20 Blast on 23 July 2017.

Steel holds a United States passport. In June 2019, he was named in a 30-man training squad for the United States cricket team, ahead of the Regional Finals of the 2018–19 ICC T20 World Cup Americas Qualifier tournament in Bermuda.

On 18 April 2021, Steel signed for Hampshire County Cricket Club on a two-month loan deal.

References

External links
 
 

1995 births
Living people
American cricketers
English cricketers
Durham MCCU cricketers
Alumni of the College of St Hild and St Bede, Durham
Middlesex cricketers
Durham cricketers
People from Greenbrae, California
Hampshire cricketers
Surrey cricketers
Cricketers from California